Meshir 2 - Coptic Calendar - Meshir 4

The third day of the Coptic month of Meshir, the sixth month of the Coptic year. On a common year, this day corresponds to January 28, of the Julian Calendar, and February 10, of the Gregorian Calendar. This day falls in the Coptic Season of Shemu, the season of the Harvest.

Commemorations

Saints 

 The departure of Saint James the Ascetic 
 The departure of Saint Hedra of the Rock of Banhadab

References 

Days of the Coptic calendar